Belle Plaine may refer to a place in North America:

United States
 Belle Plaine, Iowa
 Belle Plaine, Kansas
 Belle Plaine, Minnesota
 Belle Plaine Township, Minnesota
 Belle Plaine (Madison County, Virginia), a historic farm property
 Belle Plaine, Wisconsin, a town
 Belle Plaine (community), Wisconsin, an unincorporated community

Canada
 Belle Plaine, Saskatchewan

See also
Belle Plain (disambiguation)
Bell Plain Township, Marshall County, Illinois